The 2016–17 Virginia Tech Hokies men's basketball team represented Virginia Polytechnic Institute and State University during the 2016–17 NCAA Division I men's basketball season. The Hokies were led by third-year head coach Buzz Williams and played their home games at Cassell Coliseum in Blacksburg, Virginia as a member of the Atlantic Coast Conference. They finished the season 22–11, 10–8 in ACC play to finish a three-way tie for seventh place. As the No. 7 seed in the ACC tournament, they beat Wake Forest before losing to Florida State in the quarterfinals. They received an at-large big to the NCAA tournament. As a No. 9 seed in the East region, they lost in the first round to Wisconsin.

Last season
The Hokies finished the 2015–16 season 20–15, 10–8 in ACC play to finish in a tie for seventh place. They defeated Florida State in the second round of the ACC tournament to advance to the quarterfinals where they lost to Miami (FL). They were invited to the National Invitation Tournament where they defeated Princeton in the first round to advance to the second round where they lost to BYU.

Departures

Incoming transfers

Recruiting class

2017 recruiting class

Roster

Schedule and results

|-
!colspan=12 style=| Non-conference regular season

|-
!colspan=12 style=| ACC regular season

|-
!colspan=9 style=| ACC tournament

|-
!colspan=9 style=| NCAA tournament

Rankings

*AP does not release post-NCAA tournament rankings

References

Virginia Tech Hokies men's basketball seasons
Virginia Tech
Virginia Tech Hokies men's basketball
Virginia Tech
Virginia Tech